World Paragliding Championships is the main competitive paragliding championships in the World, organized by the Fédération Aéronautique Internationale.

Cross Country Paragliding

Paragliding Accuracy

References 
Medalists
AirSports Calendar

External links 
2015 World Championships

Paragliding
Paragliding